Rick Gonzalez (born June 30, 1979) is an American actor and musician. He is known for his roles as Timo Cruz in the motion picture Coach Carter, as Spanish in Old School, as Ben Gonzalez on the CW supernatural drama television series  Reaper, and as Naps In Roll Bounce. From 2016–2020, he portrayed the superhero vigilante character Rene Ramirez / Wild Dog on the CW superhero drama series Arrow. In 2021, he starred in the TV series adaptation of The Lost Symbol.

Early life
Gonzalez was born in New York City, of Dominican and  Puerto Rican descent. His parents met in Washington, DC, where they married. They moved and settled down in the Bushwick section of Brooklyn where they raised Gonzalez. His parents were later divorced. He attended elementary and junior high school while living in Brooklyn. Ever since he was a young child, Gonzalez would put on improvised "shows" for his family and participate in all of his school's plays. His teachers were instrumental in convincing Gonzalez to apply and try out for the High School of the Performing Arts, on which Fame was based, in Manhattan. He did as suggested and was accepted. In 1997, he graduated and began to pursue a career in acting.

Career
Gonzalez started his acting career in New York where he landed a small role in the made for television movie Thicker Than Blood (1998) as Sanchez.  In 1999, he made his feature movie debut as Ricky in the movie Mambo Cafe, which was released in the year 2000.  He followed that by participating in the film Prince of Central Park (2000) before heading for Los Angeles, California.  

In Hollywood, he landed a small part as a gangbanger in the 2001 film Crocodile Dundee in Los Angeles.  He followed that with the roles of Rudy Bonilla in The Rookie, starring Dennis Quaid and as the sex-crazed Primo in the 2003 movie Biker Boyz.  In 2005, he played the role of Timo Cruz in the movie Coach Carter.  Gonzalez also appeared in Twista's video "Hope", which is the lead single off the Coach Carter movie soundtrack. He played the male lead in Mashonda's "Back of Tha Club" video; and has also starred in the video to the Obie Trice song "Snitch", where he plays a member of a group who successfully pull off a bank robbery, and then snitches on them. Gonzalez was also in Red Cafe's video for "All Night Long" which was also in the Coach Carter movie soundtrack.

Gonzalez has appeared in the 2003 comedy Old School (alongside Luke Wilson, Vince Vaughn and Will Ferrell) as "Spanish", Laurel Canyon (2003) as Wyett, Subway Cafe (2004) as Vincent Young, War of the Worlds (2005) as Vincent, Roll Bounce (2005) as Naps, Pulse (2006) as Stone, First Snow (2006) as Andy Lopez, Illegal Tender (2007) as Wilson DeLeon Jr., What We Do Is Secret (2007) as Pat Smear. He also appears in Apartment 143 as Paul Ortega.

His TV guest appearances have been in Law & Order: Special Victims Unit (2000), Touched by an Angel (2001) as Ramone, ER (2001) as Jorge Escalona, Buffy the Vampire Slayer (2002) as Tomas, The Shield (2002), CSI: Miami (2006), Castle (2010), Lie to Me (2010), and Bones (2011). The Closer (2011) Most recently, he co-starred in the CW television series Reaper as Ben Gonzalez. Gonzalez had a blog about the 2008 MLB Post Season and was nicknamed the "October Gonzo". He co-starred in Lady Gaga's 2011 music video for her single "Judas" where he portrays Jesus. In 2013, Gonzalez appeared in the NCIS episode "Oil & Water", as Lenny Machaca. In 2022, Gonzalez appeared in Law & Order: Organized Crime' episode "Everybody Knows The Dice Are Loaded" as Det. Bobby Reyes.

Music career
On May 24, 2011 Gonzalez released his mixtape album hosted by DJ G-Spot titled "The Invisible Man" citing "I called it the invisible man because of my frustration trying to get my music career going for at least 7 years and feeling ignored by the industry. So I felt invisible to them (music industry)." He also appeared on the song "Bully Rap" off of Sean Price's last album Mic Tyson, it was released on October 30, 2012.

Filmography

Film

Television

See also

List of Puerto Ricans
List of Dominican Americans

References

External links

1979 births
American male film actors
American male television actors
Hispanic and Latino American male actors
American people of Puerto Rican descent
American people of Dominican Republic descent
Living people
Male actors from New York (state)
People from Bushwick, Brooklyn
Fiorello H. LaGuardia High School alumni